Rozen may refer to:

Anna Rozen, French writer, best known for her short stories
Issi Rozen, Israeli-born jazz guitarist living in Boston, Massachusetts
Minna Rozen (born 1947), professor emeritus at the Department of Jewish History at the University of Haifa
Rima Rozen, Canadian geneticist
Roman Rozen (1847–1921), diplomat in the service of the Russian Empire
Shimshon Rozen (1952–2011), Israeli Air Force weapon systems officer, colonel in the Israeli Defense Forces
Zvi Rozen (born 1947), Israeli former international footballer

See also
Rozen-e-Deewar, the first album recorded by Pakistani music band Rox3n
Rozen Maiden, Japanese manga series written and illustrated by Peach-Pit
Roze (disambiguation)
Rozendal
Rozenite
Rozental
Rozhen (disambiguation)

fr:Rozen
nl:Rozen